Felipe Meligeni Alves was the defending champion but withdrew before his semifinal match with Luciano Darderi.

Juan Pablo Ficovich won the title after defeating Darderi 6–3, 7–5 in the final.

Seeds

Draw

Finals

Top half

Bottom half

References

External links
Main draw
Qualifying draw

São Paulo Challenger de Tênis - 1
2021 Singles